Wang Ning ( born 14 May 1994 in Tianjin) is a female Chinese volleyball player.

Career 
She was part of the team at the 2011 FIVB World Grand Prix, and 2012 FIVB Volleyball Women's Club World Championship.

Clubs 

  Tianjin Bridgestone

References

External links 

 FIVB profile

1988 births
Living people
Chinese women's volleyball players
Middle blockers
21st-century Chinese women